The Norfolk Police and Crime Commissioner is the police and crime commissioner, an elected official tasked with setting out the way crime is tackled by Norfolk Police in the English County of Norfolk. The post was created in November 2012, following an election held on 15 November 2012, and replaced the Norfolk Police Authority. The current incumbent is Giles Orpen-Smellie, who represents the Conservative Party.

List of Norfolk Police and Crime Commissioners

Election results

References

Police and crime commissioners in England